James Seymour (1702–1752) was an English artist.

James or Jim Seymour may also refer to:

 James Seymour (Iowa politician) (born 1939), Iowa State Senator
 James Seymour (Kent cricketer) (1879–1930), English cricketer
 James Seymour (Australian cricketer), Australian cricketer
 James Seymour (screenwriter) (1895–1976)
 Jim Seymour (American football) (1946–2011), American football player
 Jim Seymour (hurdler) (born 1949), American hurdler
 James Seymour (Michigan politician) (1791–1864), Michigan politician
 James Benjamin Seymour (1867–1950), philatelist
 James M. Seymour (1837–1905), mayor of Newark, New Jersey